Empress Wang Fahui (王法慧) (360 – 24 October 380), formally Empress Xiaowuding (孝武定皇后, literally "the filial, martial, and quieting empress") was an empress during the Jin Dynasty (266–420).  Her husband was Emperor Xiaowu.

When Emperor Xiaowu was due to marry, the regent Xie An wanted to look for a noble family that was meek and virtuous. Since he respected Wang Fahui's father Wang Yun (王蘊) and brother Wang Gong (王恭) greatly, he personally visited Wang Fahui to examine her, and he was impressed with her politeness and beauty. In 375, he therefore selected her as Emperor Xiaowu's empress.  He was 14 and she was 15.

Once she became empress, however, she became obsessed with drinking and was also proud and jealous, and Emperor Xiaowu was displeased. He therefore summoned Wang Yun, his father-in-law, to ask him to counsel his daughter to change her ways. Wang, during this meeting, became so fearful that he took off his hat to apologize. He then rebuked her, and she changed her behavior. She died in 380 and was buried with honors due an empress. She did not bear any sons.

References 

|- style="text-align: center;"

|-

|-

360 births
380 deaths
Jin dynasty (266–420) empresses
4th-century Chinese women
4th-century Chinese people